The Weightlifting at the 2010 Commonwealth Games was held at the Jawaharlal Nehru Stadium, Delhi from 4 to 12 October 2010.

Weightlifting medal count

Events

Men's events

Women's events

Powerlifting

Participating nations

References

External links
 Schedule 

 
2010 Commonwealth Games events
2010 in weightlifting
2010
Powerlifting at the Commonwealth Games